The Third Amendment of the Constitution of South Africa made changes to allow the creation of municipalities that cross provincial boundaries.  It was enacted by the Parliament of South Africa, signed by President Mandela on 20 October 1998, and came into force on the 30th of the same month. The changes it made were reversed in 2005 by the Twelfth Amendment.

Provisions 
The amendment added two clauses to the Constitution. The first allowed municipal boundaries to be established across provincial boundaries by the agreement of the national and the relevant provincial governments, and provided for national legislation to regulate the process. The second provided that in such municipalities, the ward boundaries were not allowed to cross provincial boundaries. Both of these clauses were removed by the Twelfth Amendment, at the same time as many provincial boundaries were altered.

Formal title 
The official short title of the amendment is "Constitution Third Amendment Act of 1998". It was originally titled "Constitution of the Republic of South Africa Second Amendment Act, 1998" and numbered as Act No. 87 of 1997, but the Citation of Constitutional Laws Act, 2005 renamed it and abolished the practice of giving Act numbers to constitutional amendments.

External links

Official text (PDF)

Amendments of the Constitution of South Africa
1998 in South African law